Dorothy Jones Heydt (1942-2022) was a United States author of science fiction and fantasy. She lived on the U.S. West Coast and was an active participant in the Usenet newsgroups rec.arts.sf.written and rec.arts.sf.fandom, and in science fiction fandom in general. She was the originator of the "Eight Deadly Words" ("I don't care what happens to these people"), and other fan quotes. She was the originator and first editor of the Star Trek Concordance, an extensive resource guide first published in March 1969.

A linguist, she invented one of the first widely used Vulcan conlangs in 1967 for a Star Trek fan fiction series. Its words were picked up and used by other fan fiction authors such as Claire Gabriel. One term, ni var, meaning "two form", an art form in which two contrasting aspects of a subject are compared, is still used on Star Trek: Enterprise, as the name of a Vulcan ship and on Star Trek: Discovery as the new name of the planet Vulcan itself.

She wrote numerous short stories and two novels; she sometimes wrote as "Katherine Blake." Many of her stories appeared in collections edited by Marion Zimmer Bradley, including the Sword and Sorceress series, and stories in the Darkover series shared world. Marion Zimmer Bradley's Fantasy Magazine published many of her stories.

While not one of the founding members of the Society for Creative Anachronism, she did participate in the early years and helped establish important elements of the ceremonies, such as the oath of fealty used in peerage ceremonies.

Dorothy Heydt died on June 28, 2022.

Selected works
Novels
 The Interior Life, as Katherine Blake. Baen Books (1990), 
 A Point of Honor.   Daw Books (1998)

References

External links
 Detailed list of published works.

Review of The Interior Life by Jo Walton

20th-century American novelists
American science fiction writers
American women novelists
Usenet people
Women science fiction and fantasy writers
20th-century American women writers
21st-century American women